The Orange Sky. This film was made in 2006, after the Orange Revolution which took place in Ukraine.  It was directed by Oleksandr Kyryenko with the Cinema Production.

Mini-Synopsis
The movie tells of a love story of two greatly different young people. The heroine, Ivanna is a young girl with ambitiously nationalistic beliefs in the power of democracy.  She expresses her patriotism by voicing, often protesting the present regime of Ukraine in the favor of revolutionary ideals.  Mark, the protagonist, on the other hand is a privileged son of a government official whose life is filled with excitement from being able to get everything his heart desires. The two meet in the midst of a national crisis when a series of massive protests and political events were unfolding in Ukraine. Of course with the meeting, the two fall in love forever changing each other's paths. Mark is unwillingly becoming estranged from his comfortable life and seeks to obtain understanding of what drives Ivana and her friends to stand up to authority. Eventually two are united in one cause: fighting for a better future for their country. The movie uses a semi-reenactment of the actual events of the winter in Ukraine during the Orange Revolution. The protests, the rioting, the cold weather are all there.

Production

Estimate 
The cost of the film was ₴ 2.5 million ($0.5 million).

Filming and casting 
Work on the film began in late April 2005. Filming lasted 28 days and began on November 6, 2005. Filming took place in stages in Kyiv, Kamianets-Podilskyi, and the Crimea. The episode showing the Orange Revolution on the Maidan was filmed on the anniversary of the 2005 Revolution. The then Prime Minister Yuriy Yekhanurov, who did not take part in the revolutionary events, appears in the frame. More than ten thousand folk talents passed the selection "sieve" in order to get into the cast. Vinnytsia resident Lidia Obolenska took on the leading female role. According to Obolonska, it was very difficult for her to play the role of her character, as she had a poor command of the Ukrainian language. Obolonskaya was forced to specifically invite her Ukrainian-speaking friend from Lviv to speak to her in Ukrainian for a few days, which was to help Obolenskaya improve her spoken Ukrainian. In the end, according to Obolenskaya, she is still "akala" in the film.

Cast
Lidia Obolenska as Ivanna
Oleksandr Ihnatusha as Ivanna's father 
Oleksandr Lymarev as Mark Zadukha 
Ksenia Belaia as Asia 
Mykola Chindiaikin as Mark's father
Ville Haapasalo as Fedia
Oleksiy Vertynskyi as Inokentiy Valeriyanovych
Viktor Yushchenko as himself
Vitaliy Klychko as himself
Oleksandr Moroz as himself

References

External links

2006 films
Ukrainian drama films
Films set in Kyiv